NLX may refer to:

 ISO 639-3 code for the Kalto language
 nanolux, an SI unit of illumination equal to 10−9 lux
 NLX (motherboard form factor), a form factor standard for low profile retail PCs
 NLX LLC, a software company acquired by Rockwell Collins in 2003
 Nonlinear X-wave, a multi-dimensional wave that can travel without distortion
 Northern Lights Express, a proposed passenger rail service between Minneapolis and Duluth, Minnesota
 Railroad reporting mark for Allied Corporation from 1963 - 1985